Buddha Gujjar is a Pakistani Punjabi film released in 2002.

Cast and crew
Syed Noor is the film director.
Yousuf Khan as Buddha Gujjar

Accolades

See also
 Lollywood
 Badmash Gujjar

References

External links

Punjabi-language Pakistani films
2002 films
Films directed by Syed Noor
2000s Punjabi-language films